Isabel Estrada Carvalhais (born 1973) is a Portuguese politician of the Socialist Party who has been serving as a Member of the European Parliament since the 2019 elections.

Academic career
From 2000 to 2003, Carvalhais obtained her doctorate in sociology at the University of Warwick, before returning to Portugal. In 2010 she became director of the Research Centre for Political Science and International Relations at the University of Minho. From 2012 she was head of the BA course in political science, and from 2018 she had a professorship in political science and international relations at the same university.

Political career
In parliament, Carvalhais has been serving on the Committee on Agriculture and Rural Development (since 2019) and the Committee on Fisheries (since 2020). In 2020, she also joined the Committee of Inquiry on the Protection of Animals during Transport.

In addition to her committee assignments, Carvalhais is part of the parliament's delegations for relations with the United States. She is also part of the European Parliament Intergroup on Climate Change, Biodiversity and Sustainable Development, the European Parliament Intergroup on LGBT Rights and the European Parliament Intergroup on Disability.

References

1973 births
Living people
MEPs for Portugal 2019–2024
21st-century women MEPs for Portugal
Socialist Party (Portugal) MEPs